Don Bergstrom (born June 29, 1945) was an American politician and businessman.

Bergstrom was born in Minnesota and lived in Big Lake, Sherburne County, Minnesota with his wife and family. He went to the Northwestern Electronics Institute and received his bachelor's degree in vocational education from University of Minnesota. Bergstrom was the administrator of the Wright Vocational Cooperative Center. Bergstrom served in the Minnesota House of Representatives in 1983 and 1984 and was a Democrat.

References

1945 births
Living people
People from Sherburne County, Minnesota
University of Minnesota alumni
Educators from Minnesota
Democratic Party members of the Minnesota House of Representatives
American people of Swedish descent